Hans Olof Hildebrand Hildebrand (5 April 1842 – 2 February 1913) was a Swedish archeologist. He is internationally known as one of the pioneers of the archaeological technique of typology.

Biography

Born in Stockholm, he was the son of Bror Emil Hildebrand and Anna Mathilda Ekecrantz. He was the brother of historian Emil Hildebrand (1848-1919).
Hildebrand became a student in Uppsala University in 1860, graduated with a bachelor's degree in philosophy in 1865 and was promoted the following year to a doctor of philosophy. During the years 1870–1871, he made a trip abroad under a travel scholarship.  

Hildebrand, along with his father and his colleague Oscar Montelius (1843-1921), is considered to have been one of the fathers of Swedish archaeology. He worked both in archaeology and numismatics, mainly of the High and Late Middle Ages.

Between 1895 and 1913, Hildebrand was Director-General of the Swedish Academy. From 1879 to 1907 he was also Secretary to the Royal Swedish Academy of Letters, History and Antiquities and Custodian of the Swedish National Heritage Board  (Riksantikvarieämbetet). Whilst at the Academy of Letters he contributed to the foundation of the journal Fornvännen. He was a member of the Royal Swedish Academy of Sciences from 1891. He gave the Rhind Lectures in 1896, on "Industrial arts of Scandinavia in pagan times".

Personal life
He married Elin Maria Charlotta Martin in 1867. He was the father of  historian Karl Hildebrand (1870-1952) and  philanthropist Hedvig Elisabeth Carlander (1875-1961).

References 

1842 births
1913 deaths
Scientists from Stockholm
Swedish archaeologists
Uppsala University alumni
Members of the Swedish Academy
Members of the Royal Swedish Academy of Sciences
19th-century Swedish scientists
Members of the Royal Swedish Academy of Arts